The Continental Tiara series are a family of air-cooled, horizontally opposed aircraft engines. Designed and built by Continental Motors/TCM, the Tiara series were commercially unsuccessful, costing the company millions of dollars.

Design and development

Continental began development of the Tiara series in 1965. At the time, CAE, Continental Motor's turbine engine subsidiary, had developed the T65, a small turboshaft engine which was being considered by Bell for its new Model 206 helicopter. Faced with having to fund the production tooling for the T65 in order to keep the price reasonable, or funding the Tiara series, Continental's corporate management chose to invest in the Tiaras.

While the Tiara series were basically traditional boxer engines, they did have some unique features. The engines had high rotational speeds, 0.5:1 gearing was used to reduce propeller speed, with the camshaft forming an extension of the propeller shaft. The propeller shaft featured the Hydra-Torque drive to reduce the shaft's vibrations. The engines were available with four, six- and eight-cylinders. All were fuel-injected, with turbocharging being optional.

The engines' fuel consumption was high, which became a disadvantage during the 1973 oil crisis era. In addition, the Tiaras' performance was not significantly improved over existing engines, making it difficult for aircraft manufacturers to justify the costs of certificating their products for the engines. These problems led Continental to finally discontinue the engines in 1980.

Series
Reference: Continental, Teledyne Continental Motors, TCM (US); Rolls-Royce (UK) Part 1: Introduction and O-110 through OL-300

Four-cylinder
Tiara 4-180 (O-270)
180 hp, 271 cu in capacity

Six-cylinder
Tiara 6-260 (O-405)
260 hp, 406 cu in capacity
Tiara 6-260A
Tiara 6-285 (O-405)
285 hp, 406 cu in capacity
Tiara 6-285A
Tiara 6-320 (O-405)
300 hp, 406 cu in capacity
Tiara T6-260 (O-405)
260 hp, 406 cu in capacity, turbocharged
Tiara T6-285 (O-405)
285 hp, 406 cu in capacity, turbocharged
Tiara T6-320 (O-405)
300 hp, 406 cu in capacity, turbocharged

Eight-cylinder

Tiara 8-380 (O-540)
380 hp, 541 cu in
Tiara T8-450 (O-540)
450 hp, 541 cu in, turbocharged

Applications

Tiara 6
 Cerva CE.44 Couguar
 Cierva CR.640 (not built)
 Piper PA-36-285 Pawnee Brave
 Robin HR100/285TR Tiara
 Spencer S-12-EAir Car (prototype)
 Transavia PL-12 T-320 Airtruk
 Trident Trigull (prototypes)

Specifications (Tiara 6-285-A)

See also

References

External links
 Teledyne Continental Motors
 Flight International, 15 August 1968
 New Continental engine, Flight International, 12 February 1970
 World Aero-engine industry, Flight International, 20 June 1974

1960s aircraft piston engines
Tiara